Walt Disney World Airport, also known as Lake Buena Vista Airport and Lake Buena Vista STOLport , is a former small airfield owned by The Walt Disney Company, located within Walt Disney World, just east of the former Walt Disney World Speedway, in Bay Lake in Orange County, Florida, United States. When it was active, it accommodated smaller commuter airliners such as the de Havilland Canada DHC-6 Twin Otter turboprop, which had STOL ("Short Take Off and Landing") capabilities and could operate from airfields with short runways (also known as STOLports). It is no longer registered as an active airport by the FAA, ICAO, and IATA and  serves Walt Disney World as a parking and storage lot.

History
Lake Buena Vista Airport was built in 1971 to serve as a STOL airfield for Walt Disney World guests and employees, with scheduled passenger airline service to Orlando Jetport at McCoy (now Orlando International Airport, MCO) and Tampa International Airport (TPA) provided by Shawnee Airlines, using STOL-capable de Havilland Canada DHC-6 Twin Otter aircraft.  This Shawnee Airlines service is mentioned in the "Air Commuter Service" section of the Sept. 6, 1972 Eastern Air Lines system timetable as a connecting service to and from Eastern flights at Orlando and Tampa.  Executive Airlines also offered scheduled commuter DHC-6 Twin Otter passenger service into the airport.

The airport was never large, with only enough ramp space at the passenger terminal to accommodate four aircraft at a time; no hangar space was ever built.  This STOL airfield was intended as a proof-of-concept, but was ultimately rejected in favor of a vision for a larger, full-service airport within Walt Disney World itself. All passenger service was discontinued by the 1980s, largely due to extensions of the Walt Disney World Monorail System on either side.  As of 2021, flight operations below 3,000 feet are restricted by a permanent Temporary Flight Restriction (TFR) in place since 2003; The runway and apron have been converted to car parking and is visible to motorists traveling along World Drive toward the Transportation and Ticket Center, as well as by passengers on the monorail.

Service
There has been no scheduled or unscheduled commercial service to this airport since the early 1980s.  The next nearest airport, Kissimmee Gateway Airport, briefly offered passenger service through the now defunct DayJet; currently, most Walt Disney World guests arrive through Orlando International Airport and Orlando Sanford International Airport.

"The Singing Airport" 
The runway featured a set of grooves, like rumble strips on the side of a highway, that played "When You Wish Upon a Star" when driven over at roughly 45 miles per hour to surprise the airplane passengers. The musical grooves were removed in 2008.

It is considered a precursor to future musical roads, the first of which was built in Denmark in 1995. The musical road in the village of Takayama, Gunma, Japan, plays the same song the "Singing Runway" once did.

See also
Disney Transport
Epcot Center Ultralight Flightpark

References

External links
 DWS at Abandoned & Little-Known Airfields
 "The short, short life of Disney World's STOLport", Jim Hill
 Yesterland: This Week at Walt Disney World, Summer 1972
 DWS on WikiMapia

Defunct airports in Florida
Walt Disney World